Two ships of the Royal Navy have borne the name HMS Eden:

  was a 24-gun sixth rate launched in 1814. She was used for experiments between 1816 and 1817, and was broken up in 1833.

Royal Navy ship names